There are at least 39 named lakes and reservoirs in Cross County, Arkansas.

Lakes

 Allens Lake, el.  
 Anderson Lake, el.  
 Barnes Lake, el.  
 Dog Pond, el.  
 Fishing Lake, el.  
 Grassy Lake, el.  
 Harris Pond, el.  
 Hill Lake, el.  
 Jack Lake, el.  
 Little Blackfish Lake, el.  
 Neelys Lake, el.  
 Old River, el.  
 Patterson Lake, el.  
 Prophet Lake, el.  
 Rainbow Lake, el.  
 Shaver Lake, el.  
 Shell Lake, el.  
 Snowden Lake, el.  
 Swan Lake, el.  
 Walnut Timber Lake, el.  
 Wittsburg Lake, el.  
 Yancopin Lake, el.

Reservoirs
 Caney Creek Site One Reservoir, el.  
 Caney Creek Site Two Reservoir, el.  
 Caney Creek Site 3a Reservoir, el.  
 Caney Creek Site Four Reservoir, el.  
 Caney Creek Site Five Reservoir, el.  
 Caney Creek Site Six Reservoir, el.  
 Caney Creek Site Seven Reservoir, el.  
 Cathy Lake, el.  
 Cooper Pond, el.  
 Gardner Lake, el.  
 Hall Lake, el.  
 Hidden Valley, el.  
 Hunter Rest Club Lake, el.  
 Lake Austell, el.  
 Lake Dunn, el.  
 Pufahl Reservoir, el.  
 Robinson Lake, el.

See also

 List of lakes in Arkansas

Notes

Bodies of water of Cross County, Arkansas
Cross